GLMA: Health Professionals Advancing LGBTQ Equality (GLMA) is an international organization of approximately 1,000 LGBT healthcare professionals and students of all disciplines.  Its members include physicians, advanced practice nurses, physician assistants, nurses, behavioral health specialists, researchers and academician, and their supporters in the United States and internationally.

Founded in 1981 as the American Association of Physicians for Human Rights, GLMA "came out of the closet" and changed its name in 1994 to the Gay and Lesbian Medical Association. GLMA changed its name again in 2012 to GLMA: Health Professionals Advancing LGBT Equality, later adding the Q in 2018.

GLMA's mission is to ensure equality in healthcare for LGBTQ individuals and healthcare professionals. GLMA achieves its goals by using its members' health and medical expertise in professional education, public policy work, patient education and referrals, and the promotion of research.

GLMA's Annual Conference on LGBTQ Health, generally held in the fall, is the world's largest scientific gathering devoted to LGBTQ health issues and concerns. GLMA's Annual Conference on LGBTQ Health educates practitioners and students—from across the health professions—about the unique health needs of LGBTQ individuals and families. The conference is a forum for discussion and exploration of how best to address these needs and the needs of LGBTQ health professionals and health profession students. GLMA's Annual Conference on LGBTQ Health also reports on research into the health needs of LGBTQ people.

GLMA "works to combat homophobia within the medical profession and in society at large; to promote quality health care for LGBTQ and HIV-positive people; to foster a professional climate in which our diverse members can achieve their full potential, and to support members challenged by discrimination based on sexual orientation.

GLMA worked with the American Medical Association (AMA) to adopt measures requiring "the physician's nonjudgmental recognition of sexual orientation and behavior," and to reverse a 13-year-old AMA policy of encouraging programs to acquaint gay patients with "the possibility of sex preference reversal in selected cases." They also have published the Journal of the Gay and Lesbian Medical Association.

Research activities
The mission of the Lesbian Health Fund (LHF), a project of GLMA, is to improve the health of lesbians and other sexual minority women (SMW) and their families through research. Founded in 1992, LHF has awarded more than $754,000 to fund lesbian health research, and is the only U.S. research fund dedicated solely to the unique health needs of lesbians and other SMW.

In the summer of 2006, GLMA undertook a project to investigate the causes and extent of methamphetamine use among gay men and other men who have sex with men (MSM), options for treating methamphetamine dependence, and how best to get methamphetamine-dependent gay men into appropriate treatment, as well as to explore other issues and controversies associated with these issues.

See also

Gay Doctors Ireland
Healthcare and the LGBT community
List of LGBT medical organizations

References

External links
 

International LGBT political advocacy groups
LGBT health organizations in the United States
LGBT professional associations
Medical and health organizations based in Washington, D.C.
Medical associations based in the United States
Organizations based in Washington, D.C.
Organizations established in 1981
Sexuality in Washington, D.C.